The following are international rankings of Chile.

General

Cities
GaWC Inventory of World Cities, 2008: Santiago de Chile is an Alpha-ranked world city

Economic
International Monetary Fund: GDP (nominal) per capita 2007, ranked 52 out of 182 countries
International Monetary Fund: GDP (nominal) 2007, ranked 43 out of 179 countries

Military
 The World Factbook: military funding, ranked 28 out of 169 countries
 CSIS: active troops, ranked 50 out of 165 countries

Social
Population ranked 60 out of 221 countries

Technological
The World Factbook: number of Internet users, ranked 32 out of 192 countries

See also

Lists of countries
Lists by country
List of international rankings

References

External links

BBC News country profile
CIA World Factbook

Chile